Michael Terrace (born Michael Santiago Gutierrez; December 31, 1926 in Spanish Harlem, New York City) is a retired ballroom and Broadway stage dancer, choreographer, actor, dance consultant, and writer. His stage and subsequent dance career spans a total of 60 years, during which he's made innumerable contributions to ballroom dancing.  Terrace played Bernardo in West Side Story with the national company and was picked out of 2,500 ballet dancers to be at the Metropolitan Opera House with the Bolshoi Ballet Company of Russia.

Terrace met and married Elita Cleveland and formed the dance team Terrace & Elita.  Some of the original "Mambo-niks", Michael and Elita, were regulars in the Palladium Ballroom dance competitions and helped to bring the Mambo craze to mainstream America.  They worked closely and often with legends such as Tito Puente, Machito, Sammy Davis, Jr., Harry Belafonte and many other stars of the 1950s and 1960s. 

Terrace is particularly associated with the film Dirty Dancing (1987).  His stories of the formative years of the mambo in the Catskills inspired Eleanor Bergstein's vision of lead character Johnny Castle (played by Patrick Swayze).

In his later years, he opened a dance studio in Englewood, NJ,  was featured in the Bravo documentary "The Palladium: Where Mambo was King" , appeared in bit parts in feature films, and has written many stories about the Palladium.

References

1926 births
American ballroom dancers
Living people
People from East Harlem
American male dancers
People from Fort Lee, New Jersey
Mambo
Palladium